Bogside (Fife) railway station served the hamlet of Bogside, Fife, Scotland from 1850 to 1958 on the Stirling and Dunfermline Railway.

History 
The station opened as Bogside on 28 August 1850 by the North British Railway. To the north were gunpowder sidings that served Muirside Depot and to the east was a line that served Bogside Colliery. The station's name was changed to Bogside Fife in 1933 to avoid confusion with the one in North Ayrshire. The station closed to passengers on 15 September 1958. It remained open to goods traffic until 1979.

References

External links 

Disused railway stations in Fife
Railway stations in Great Britain opened in 1850
Railway stations in Great Britain closed in 1958
Former North British Railway stations
1850 establishments in Scotland
1958 disestablishments in Scotland